An election to South Pembrokeshire District Council was held in May 1987.  An Independent majority was maintained. It was preceded by the 1983 election and followed by the 1991 election. On the same day there were elections to the other local authorities and community councils in Wales.

Boundary Changes
There was a slight reduction in the number of seats as boundaries were realigned.

Results

Amroth (one seat)

Begelly (one seat)

Carew (one seat)

Hundleton (one seat)

Lampeter Velfrey (one seat)

Lamphey(one seat)

Manorbier(one seat)

Martletwy (one seat)

Narberth Rural (one seat)

Narberth Urban(one seat)

Pembroke Monkton (one seat)

Pembroke St Mary (two seats)

Pembroke St Michael (two seats)

Pembroke Dock Central (one seat)

Pembroke Dock Llanion (two seats)

Pembroke Dock Market (one seat)

Pembroke Dock Pennar (two seats)

Penally(one seat)

Saundersfoot (two seats)

Stackpole (one seat)

Tenby (four seats)

References

South Pembrokeshire District Council elections
South Pembrokeshire District Council election